Carlo Oliver D. Diasnes (born June 23, 1971) is a Filipino medical doctor and politician. A member of the Lakas Kampi CMD party, he served a member of the House of Representatives of the Philippines, representing the Lone District of Batanes from 2007 to 2010.

References
 

Filipino medical doctors
People from Batanes
1971 births
Living people
Kabalikat ng Malayang Pilipino politicians
Members of the House of Representatives of the Philippines from Batanes
Independent politicians in the Philippines
Lakas–CMD politicians